Love Boat: The Next Wave is an American comedy television series that aired on UPN from April 13, 1998 to May 21, 1999. It was a revival of the original 1977–1986 ABC television series The Love Boat.

Plot
Set aboard the cruise ship Sun Princess, the series starred Robert Urich as Captain Jim Kennedy, a retired and divorced U.S. Navy officer with a teen-aged son, Danny (Kyle Howard). Phil Morris played Chief Purser Will Sanders, and Joan Severance played Security Chief Camille Hunter.

"Reunion" episode
A reunion-themed episode reunited several cast members of the original The Love Boat – Gavin MacLeod (Captain Stubing), Bernie Kopell (Dr. Adam "Doc" Bricker), Ted Lange (Isaac Washington), Jill Whelan (Vicki Stubing) and Lauren Tewes (Julie McCoy). This episode revealed that Julie and "Doc" had been in love all along.

Cast

Main
Robert Urich as Captain Jim Kennedy III 
Phil Morris as Chief Purser Will Sanders 
Stacey Travis as Cruise Director Suzanne Zimmerman (season 1)
Corey Parker as Ship's Doctor John Morgan
Randy Vasquez as Bar Manager Paolo Kaire 
Kyle Howard as Danny Kennedy 
Joan Severance as Security Chief Camille Hunter 
Heidi Mark as Cruise Director Nicole Jordan (season 2)

Recurring
Tim Maculan as Donald Griswald

Episodes

Series overview

Season 1 (1998)

Season 2 (1998–99)

Reception 
Carole Horst of Variety called it "a pleasant one-hour trip" that will appeal to fans of the original show. However, in his review, Ken Tucker of Entertainment Weekly gave the show a grade of D+.

References

External links
 
 

1990s American anthology television series
1990s American comedy television series
1998 American television series debuts
1999 American television series endings
English-language television shows
Television series by CBS Studios
Television series by Spelling Television
American television spin-offs
UPN original programming
Princess Cruises
Television series set on cruise ships